Anna Maria Murphy (born 10 August 1989) is a Swiss musician, singer, songwriter and audio engineer. She is best known as the female lead vocalist of Swiss folk metal band Eluveitie from 2006 until 2016, in which she also played hurdy-gurdy and flute. Since her departure from Eluveitie, she has been the lead vocalist of Swiss progressive metal band Cellar Darling.

Early life 
Anna Murphy was born 10 August 1989 in Lucerne, Switzerland. Her father, Andrew Murphy, is a Dublin-born Irish person and her mother, Christiane Boesiger, is a native Swiss. Because both of her parents work in Switzerland as professional opera singers, she came in contact with music in her early childhood years.

Music career 
In 2006, at the age of 16, she became the hurdy-gurdy player of the Swiss folk metal band Eluveitie. It provided a certain Celtic feel to the band.

In early 2010, Murphy formed, together with fellow Eluveitie member Meri Tadic, the ambient project godnr.universe!. By the end of the year, she also joined the folk group Fräkmündt (named after the ancient name of Mount Pilatus), which was one of the national contestants of the Eurovision Song Contest in 2011. In the end, their song D'Draachejongfer could not beat In Love for a While (a song by Anna Rossinelli). Since the spring of 2011, Murphy worked as an audio engineer at the Obernauer Soundfarm Studios in Lucerne. In that same year, she also became a permanent member of the band Nucleus Torn.

She left Eluveitie on 5 May 2016, following Ivo Henzi and Merlin Sutter and starting a new band with them. This band is called Cellar Darling after her solo album.

In August 2022, Maer, a Dark Folk/Chamber Prog project from Anna Murphy and  Marjana Semkina (Iamthemorning) was announced.

Discography

With Eluveitie

Studio albums 
 Slania (2008)
 Evocation I: The Arcane Dominion (2009)
 Everything Remains (As It Never Was) (2010)
 Helvetios (2012)
 Origins (2014)

With godnr.universe! 
 godnr.universe! (2010)

With Fräkmündt 
 Uufwärts e d'Föuse, bärgwärts e d'Rueh (2010)
 Heiwehland (2011)
 Landlieder & Frömdländler (2014)

With Nucleus Torn 
 Golden Age (2011)
 Street Lights Fail (2014)

With Lethe 
 When Dreams Become Nightmares (2014)
 The First Corpse On The Moon (2017)

With Cellar Darling 
 This Is the Sound (2017)
 The Spell (2019)

With Maer 
 Sister (2022)

Solo work

Studio albums 
 Cellar Darling (2013)

Guest appearances 
 Holy Grail – Crisis in Utopia (2010)
 Swashbuckle – Crime Always Pays (2010)
 Varg – Wolfskult (2011)
 Status Minor – Ouroboros (2011)
 Blutmond – Revolution Is Dead (2012)
 Haïrdrÿer – Off to Haïradise (2014)
 Varg – Rotkäppchen (2015)
 Back to Life – A Tribute to Goodbye to Gravity (2016)
 Evenmore – Last Ride (2016)
 Varg – Das Ende aller Lügen (2016)
 Folkestone – Ossidiana (2017)
 Leah – Ancient Winter (2018)
 Appearance of Nothing – In Times of Darkness (2019)
 Wear Your Sins – Orpheus Omega (2019)

References

External links 

Anna Murphy on the official website of Eluveitie
 

1989 births
Living people
21st-century Swiss women singers
Women heavy metal singers
Hurdy-gurdy players
People from Lucerne
Swiss people of Irish descent